The 2019 Southern Conference women's basketball tournament was held between March 7 and 10 in Asheville, North Carolina, at the U.S. Cellular Center. Mercer defeated Furman 66–63 to earn their second consecutive trip to the NCAA Tournament.

Seeds
Teams are seeded by record within the conference, with a tiebreaker system to seed teams with identical conference records.

Schedule
All tournament games are streamed on  ESPN+. The championship was televised across the region on select Nexstar stations and simulcast on ESPN+.

Bracket
 All times are Eastern.

All-Tournament teams

First team
Tierra Hodges, Furman
Taylor Petty, Furman
KeKe Calloway, Mercer
Amanda Thompson, Mercer
Shannon Titus, Mercer
Jasmine Joyner, Chattanooga

Second team
Lakelyn Bouldin, Chattanooga
Da'Ja Green, Wofford
Le’Jzae Davidson, Furman
Celena Taborn, Furman
Rachel Selph, Mercer

Most Outstanding Player
KeKe Calloway, Mercer

Source:

See also
2019 Southern Conference men's basketball tournament

References

2018–19 Southern Conference women's basketball season
SoCon women's
College basketball tournaments in North Carolina
SoCon women's
Southern Conference women's basketball tournament
Southern Conference women's basketball tournament
Southern Conference women's basketball tournament